South Bristol is a town in Lincoln County, Maine, United States. The population was 1,127 at the 2020 census. A fishing and resort area, South Bristol includes the villages of Walpole and Christmas Cove, the latter on Rutherford Island. The town has six nature preserves.

History

The town was once territory of the Wawenock (or more precisely Walinakiak, meaning "People of the Bays") Abenaki people, who traveled in canoes to hunt for fish, shellfish, seals and seafowl. In 1614, Captain John Smith explored the coast, and is said to have named Christmas Cove when he visited it on Christmas Day. The land was subsequently part of the Pemaquid Patent, granted by the Plymouth Council for New England in 1631 to Robert Aldsworth and Gyles Elbridge, merchants from Bristol, England, from which the town derives its name.

A palisade fort and settlement were built on the adjacent Pemaquid Peninsula. Between 1630 and 1650, the area was the center for fur trading in Maine. It was attacked and rebuilt repeatedly during the French and Indian Wars, with the final two attacks occurring in 1747 at Fort Frederick. In 1765, Bristol was incorporated as a town, with South Bristol its western portion. On March 26, 1915, South Bristol was set off and incorporated as a separate town.

In the 1800s, the village of Walpole was noted for brickmaking and ice harvesting. Brickyards along the Damariscotta River supplied many of the bricks used to build Boston's Back Bay neighborhood. The ice business faded with the advent of refrigeration, but the Thompson Ice House, established in 1826, is now preserved as the Thompson Ice Harvesting Museum. The Bristol Yacht Building Company, later known as H.F. Gamage Shipbuilding, built minesweepers for the United States Navy during World War II. Shipbuilding has remained important, with schooners, fishing trawlers, lobster boats and yachts constructed at the town. The Hudson River Sloop Clearwater was built here in 1968. Other industries in South Bristol are fishing, lobstering, clamming, aquaculture and tourism.

The peninsula and Rutherford Island were connected by a swing bridge, one of only three in Maine, which spanned "The Gut." In 2017 the swing bridge was replaced with a safer drawbridge. For well over a century, Rutherford Island in particular has been a vacation destination for families from Massachusetts, Connecticut, New York and New Jersey. Many homes on the island are owned by these families.

Geography
The town is in southern Lincoln County, bordered to the west by the tidal Damariscotta River, to the east by Johns Bay and the tidal Johns River, and to the south by the Atlantic Ocean. The southern one-third of the town is on Rutherford Island, separated from the mainland by The Gut. The island was named after the Reverend Robert Rutherford, who came with David Dunbar's group to the area from North Ireland in 1729. The village of South Bristol is on both sides of The Gut, while Christmas Cove is at the south end of Rutherford Island, and the locales of West Bristol and Walpole are to the north on the mainland. The town of Bristol is to the east and north, while the towns of Newcastle, Edgecomb, and Boothbay (listed from north to south) are to the west across the Damariscotta River.

The town is crossed by Maine State Route 129. The highway leads north to Damariscotta,  from South Bristol village.

Demographics

2010 census
As of the census of 2010, there were 892 people, 418 households, and 275 families residing in the town. The racial makeup of the town was 98.5% White, 0.6% African American, 0.1% Native American, 0.2% Asian, and 0.6% from two or more races. Hispanic or Latino of any race were 0.6% of the population.

There were 418 households, of which 19.6% had children under the age of 18 living with them, 55.7% were married couples living together, 8.1% had a female householder with no husband present, 1.9% had a male householder with no wife present, and 34.2% were non-families. 29.4% of all households were made up of individuals, and 16% had someone living alone who was 65 years of age or older. The average household size was 2.13 and the average family size was 2.57.

The median age in the town was 54.1 years. 15.8% of residents were under the age of 18; 3.8% were between the ages of 18 and 24; 17.2% were from 25 to 44; 32.9% were from 45 to 64; and 30.2% were 65 years of age or older. The gender makeup of the town was 48.4% male and 51.6% female.

2000 census
As of the census of 2000, there were 897 people, 410 households, and 277 families residing in the town. The racial makeup of the town was 99.00% White, 0.11% Native American, 0.22% Asian, and 0.67% from two or more races. Hispanic or Latino of any race were 0.45% of the population.

There were 410 households, out of which 20.5% had children under the age of 18 living with them, 60.0% were married couples living together, 4.9% had a female householder with no husband present, and 32.2% were non-families. 25.4% of all households were made up of individuals, and 12.9% had someone living alone who was 65 years of age or older.  The average household size was 2.19 and the average family size was 2.58.

In the town, the population was spread out, with 16.7% under the age of 18, 4.6% from 18 to 24, 18.8% from 25 to 44, 34.9% from 45 to 64, and 25.0% who were 65 years of age or older.  The median age was 52 years. For every 100 females, there were 98.5 males.  For every 100 females age 18 and over, there were 97.6 males.

The median income for a household in the town was $38,636, and the median income for a family was $46,765. Males had a median income of $31,696 versus $21,563 for females. The per capita income for the town was $28,233.  About 3.5% of families and 7.5% of the population were below the poverty line, including 6.0% of those under age 18 and 15.0% of those age 65 or over.

Sites of interest
 South Bristol Historical Society
 Thompson Ice Harvesting Museum
 Walpole Meeting House (1772)
 Witch Island Audubon Sanctuary

References

External links
 Official website
 Rutherford Library
 MaineDOT Goes Back to the Drawing Board to Replace Swing Bridge
 Locals revise South Bristol bridge plans, DOT listens

Towns in Lincoln County, Maine
Towns in Maine
Populated coastal places in Maine